Franco Bertoli (born 29 April 1959 in Udine) is an Italian former volleyball player who competed in the 1980 Summer Olympics in Moscow and in the 1984 Summer Olympics in Los Angeles.

As a volleyball player, he gained the nickname of mano di pietra (stone-hand) for his attack skills.

In 1980 he was part of the Italian team which finished ninth in the Olympic tournament. He played four matches. Four years later he won the bronze medal with the Italian team in the 1984 Olympic tournament. He played all six matches. In total he gained 219 caps with the Italian national team and was also appointed captain of the national team. He was declared best overall player in the 1983 European Championships in Berlin.

In his club career, Bertoli was a mainstay of Klippan Torino (1977-1983) first and then of Panini Modena (1984-1990), two of the most successful Italian teams in the 1980s; later he moved to Milan Volley, a short-lived volley companion of Silvio Berlusconi's AC Milan, where he won two World Cups in 1990 and 1992. Subsequently, he worked as a coach for the Modena's volleyball team (He won Italian and European Championship in 1998) them in Rome and Genova.

He was a TV commentator for Sky Sports Italia for about eleven years, until the London Olympic Games in 2012.

Now Franco Bertoli works as professional coach, he is member of the ICF, International Coach Federation.
He is also an accredited Teacher in Numerology, Dip. CSN. AIN. and an Aura-Soma Colour-Care System Coach.

Website: www.francobertoli.com

External links
 Franco Bertoli's Website
Detailed club career 
 

1959 births
Living people
Sportspeople from Udine
Italian men's volleyball players
Italian volleyball coaches
Olympic volleyball players of Italy
Volleyball players at the 1980 Summer Olympics
Volleyball players at the 1984 Summer Olympics
Olympic bronze medalists for Italy
Olympic medalists in volleyball
Medalists at the 1984 Summer Olympics